El Dorado County, officially the County of El Dorado, is a county located in the U.S. state of California. As of the 2020 census, the population was 191,185. The county seat is Placerville. The County is part of the Sacramento-Roseville-Arden-Arcade, CA Metropolitan Statistical Area. It is located entirely in the Sierra Nevada, from the historic Gold Country in the western foothills to the High Sierra in the east. El Dorado County's population has grown as Greater Sacramento has expanded into the region. Where the county line crosses US 50 at Clarksville, the distance to Sacramento is 15 miles. In the county's high altitude eastern end at Lake Tahoe, environmental awareness and environmental protection initiatives have grown along with the population since the 1960 Winter Olympics, hosted at the former Squaw Valley Ski Resort in neighboring Placer County.

History

What is now known as El Dorado County has been home to the Maidu, Nisenan, Washoe, and Miwok Indigenous American nations for centuries. Because of colonization, their numbers dropped severely. Today many indigenous people in El Dorado County, like the Nissenan are telling their stories and culture, praying in their languages sharing their history; Once seen as struggling to survive to now on their way to having once broken treaties re-recognized and honored. Indigenous stories did not begin at the gold rush, and they will continue long after.  According to a California census, by 1870, there were only 100 indigenous people left in El Dorado County due to violent California laws that paid white settlers a small fee for the scalps of Indigenous children and adults in an attempt to strategically wipe out the existing communities. Along with intentional genocide, excessive resource degradation such as logging, trapping bears and other animals for fur, water and soil contamination from mining played a part in the attempt to “starve out” indigenous communities. A settler looking to start a company processing cut trees found gold on the land he started using. The region became famous for being the site of the 1848 gold discovery that sparked the California Gold Rush.  The County of El Dorado was one of California's original 27 counties created effective February 18, 1850 (the number has risen to 58 today).  Its name is derived from the Spanish meaning "the gilded/golden".

The final segments of the Pony Express mail route ran through El Dorado County until its replacement with the telegraph service in 1861; U.S. Highway 50 follows the Pony Express route today.
 Mother lode
 James W. Marshall
 California Mining and Mineral Museum
Local landmarks:
 Marshall Gold Discovery State Historic Park
 Confidence Hall
 Fountain-Tallman Soda Works
 John Pearson Soda Works
 Combellack-Blair House
 Rubicon Point Light

The Placerville Mountain Democrat, California's oldest surviving newspaper, serves El Dorado County.

The Caldor Fire started on August 14, 2021, near Little Mountain, south of Pollock Pines in El Dorado County, about two miles East of Omo Ranch and four miles south of Grizzly Flats. It initially burned slowly, but exploded in size on August 16 due to high winds. By August 20 the fire had burned nearly to Highway 50, forcing a closure of the highway. Over the next few days, the fire crossed Highway 50 in the vicinity of Kyburz. Starting on August 27 winds drove the fire rapidly east towards the Lake Tahoe Basin.

Government and policing

Policing

The El Dorado County Sheriff provides court protection, county jail administration, and coroner service for all of the county and provides patrol and detective services for the unincorporated areas of the county.  Incorporated towns Placerville, population 11,000, has a municipal police department, as does South Lake Tahoe, population 22,000.

Sheriffs
 James Hume (18 Feb 1850- 7 Nov 1852)
 Steven Charles Austin (7 Nov 1852- 7 Nov 1856)
 William Tanner Henson (7 Nov 1856- 15 Sep 1859) - Resigned
 Walter J. Burwell (15 Sep 1859- 15 Aug 1863) - Resigned
 Henry Gooding (15 Aug 1863- 7 Nov 1867)
 Jacob Hart Neff (7 Nov 1867- 7 Nov 1871)
 Charles Benjamin Dunnam (7 Niv 1871- 7 Nov 1875)
 Jason McCormick (7 Nov 1875- 7 Nov 1881)
 George Burnham (7 Nov 1881- 7 Nov 1883)
 Thomas Augustus Galt (7 Nov 1883- 7 Nov 1887)
 George H. Hilbert (7 Nov 1887- 7 Nov 1898)
 Archie Speer Bosquit (7 Nov 1898- 7 Nov 1907)
 Gilbert Cook (7 Nov 1907- 9 May 1912) - Suicide
 Albert George Bradshaw (9 May 1912- 7 Nov 1914)
 Charles E. Hand (7 Nov 1914- 7 Nov 1925)
 Charles F. Woods (7 Nov 1925- 7 Nov 1931)
 George Martin Smith Sr. 7 Nov 1931- 7 Nov 1941)
 Lowell Fred West (7 Nov 1941- 7 Nov 1949)
 Rowland Lee Morris (7 Nov 1949- 7 Nov 1955)
 Ernie Carlson (7 Nov 1955- 7 Nov 1965)
 Robert Mitchum (7 Nov 1965- 7 Nov 1971)
 Ernie Carlson (7 Nov 1971- 7 Nov 1975)
 Al Coombs (7 Nov 1975 - 7 Nov 1977)
 Richard "Dick" Pacileo (7 Nov 1975 - 7 Nov 1991)
 Don McDonald ( 1991 - 1997)
 Hal Barker (1997 - 2002)
 Jeff Neves (7 Nov 2001- 7 Nov 2010)
 John D'Agostini (7 Nov 2010 - 3 Jan 2023)
 Jeff Leikauf (current, from 3 Jan 2023)

Geography

The county, owing to its location in the Sierra Nevada, consists of rolling hills and mountainous terrain. The northeast corner is in the Lake Tahoe Basin (part of the Great Basin), including a portion of the lake itself. Across the Sierra crest to the west lies the majority of the county, referred to as the “western slope.” A portion of Folsom Lake is in the northwest corner of the county.

Much of the county is public land. The Eldorado National Forest comprises a significant portion (approximately 43%) of the county's land area, primarily on the western slope. The Lake Tahoe Basin Management Unit, formerly part of the Eldorado and two other National Forests, manages much of the land east of the crest. The Pacific Crest Trail runs through the eastern part of the county, along or roughly paralleling the Sierra crest. The county is home to the Desolation Wilderness, a popular destination for hiking, backpacking, and fishing.

Adjacent counties
 Placer County - north
 Douglas County, Nevada - northeast
 Alpine County - southeast
 Amador County - south
 Sacramento County - southwest

Geographic features

 American River
 Carson Range
 Crystal Range
 Echo Lake
 Fallen Leaf Lake
 Folsom Lake
 Francis Lake
 Freel Peak as its highest point at 
 Gilmore Lake
 Green Springs Ranch
 Lake Tahoe
 Loon Lake
 Lost Lake
 Mount Price
 Mount Tallac
 Pyramid Lake
 Sierra Nevada
 Silver Peak
 Talking Mountain
 Union Valley Reservoir
 Waca Lake

Recreation

Parks

 D. L. Bliss State Park
 Desolation Wilderness
 Eagle Falls trailhead
 Eldorado National Forest
 Emerald Bay State Park
 Folsom Lake State Recreation Area
 Glen Alpine Springs trailhead
 Marshall Gold Discovery State Historic Park
 Pine Hill Ecological Reserve
 Tahoe National Forest

Skiing
 Heavenly Ski Resort
 Sierra-At-Tahoe Ski Resort

Racing
 Placerville Speedway

Wineries
 California Shenandoah Valley AVA
 El Dorado AVA
 Fair Play AVA
 Sierra Foothills AVA

Demographics
The vast majority of the population lives in a narrow strip along U.S. Route 50, with the majority living between El Dorado Hills and Pollock Pines. The remainder reside in the South Lake Tahoe area, and in various dispersed rural communities.

2020 census

Note: the US Census treats Hispanic/Latino as an ethnic category. This table excludes Latinos from the racial categories and assigns them to a separate category. Hispanics/Latinos can be of any race.

2011

Places by population, race, and income

2010 Census
The 2010 United States Census reported that El Dorado County had a population of 181,058. The racial makeup of El Dorado County was 156,793 (86.6%) White, 1,409 (0.8%) African American, 2,070 (1.1%) Native American, 6,297 (3.5%) Asian, 294 (0.2%) Pacific Islander, 7,278 (4.0%) from other races, and 6,917 (3.8%) from two or more races. Hispanic or Latino of any race were 21,875 persons (12.1%).  The largest growth in the county has come in El Dorado Hills where the population grew by 24,092 residents to a total of 42,108 since 2000.

2000
As of the census of 2000, there were 156,299 people, 58,939 households, and 43,025 families residing in the county. There were 71,278 housing units at an average density of 42 per square mile (16/km2). The racial makeup of the county was 89.7% White, 0.5% Black or African American, 1.0% Native American, 2.1% Asian, 0.1% Pacific Islander, 3.6% from other races, and 3.0% from two or more races. 9.3% of the population were Hispanic or Latino of any race. 14.9% were of German, 13.4% English, 10.3% Irish, 6.6% Italian and 6.6% American ancestry according to Census 2000. 90.5% spoke English and 6.5% Spanish as their first language.

There were 58,939 households, out of which 34.2% had youngsters under the age of 18 living with them, 60.1% were married couples living together, 8.9% had a female householder with no husband present, and 27.0% were non-families. 20.1% of all households were made up of individuals, and 7.3% had someone living alone who was 65 years of age or older.  The average household size was 2.63 and the average family size was 3.04.

In the county, the population was spread out, with 26.1% under the age of 18, 6.8% from 18 to 24, 27.8% from 25 to 44, 26.9% from 45 to 64, and 12.4% who were 65 years of age or older.  The median age was 39 years. For every 100 females, there were 99.5 males.  For every 100 females age 18 and over, there were 97.3 males.

The 2000 census also states that the median income for a household in the county was $51,484, and the median income for a family was $60,250. Males had a median income of $46,373 versus $31,537 for females. The per capita income for the county was $25,560.  About 5.0% of families and 7.1% of the population were below the poverty line, including 7.6% of those under age 18 and 5.0% of those age 65 or over.

Politics

Voter registration statistics

Cities by population and voter registration

Overview 
El Dorado is a predominantly Republican county in presidential and congressional elections. However, from 1880 until 1952, the county was a Democratic stronghold, with Theodore Roosevelt and Warren Harding being the only two Republicans to carry the county. Since 1952, however, El Dorado has gone Democratic only three times: in 1960 narrowly for John F. Kennedy, in 1964 in a landslide for Lyndon Johnson, and in 1976 narrowly for Jimmy Carter.

 
 
 
 
 
 
 
 
 
 
 
 
 
 
 
 
 
 
 
 
 
 
 
 
 
 
 
 
 
 
 

The county is noted as a center of political concern with the United Nations non-binding sustainable development plan Agenda 21, which was on the County Board of Supervisors meeting Agenda on May 15, 2012. Concerns included the threat of U.S. Forest Service road closures and traffic roundabouts. On February 19, 2013, 14 members of the El Dorado County Grand Jury resigned, forcing Supervising Judge Steven Bailey to dissolve it.

El Dorado County is split between two Congressional districts, with the western third of the County in the 5th Congressional District, represnted by Tom McClintock, and the eastern two-thirds in the 3rd Congressional District, represnted by Kevin Kiley.

Crime 

The following table includes the number of incidents reported and the rate per 1,000 persons for each type of offense.

Cities by population and crime rates

Transportation

Major highways

  U.S. Route 50
  State Route 49
  State Route 89
  State Route 193
 Luther Pass

Public transportation
 El Dorado Transit runs local service in Placerville and surrounding areas (as far east as Pollock Pines). Commuter service into Sacramento and Folsom is also provided.
 Tahoe Transportation District http://tahoetransportation.org/ is the transit operator for the South Lake Tahoe area. Service also runs into the state of Nevada.

Airports
General aviation airports include Placerville Airport, Georgetown Airport, Cameron Park airport and Lake Tahoe Airport.

Asbestos
Portions of El Dorado County are known to contain natural asbestos formations near the surface.  The USGS studied amphiboles in rock and soil in the area in response to an EPA sampling study and subsequent criticism of the EPA study.  The study found that many amphibole particles in the area meet the counting rule criteria used by the EPA for chemical and morphological limits, but do not meet morphological requirements for commercial-grade-asbestos.  The executive summary pointed out that even particles that do not meet requirements for commercial-grade-asbestos may be a health threat and suggested a collaborative research effort to assess health risks associated with naturally occurring asbestos.

In 2003 after construction of the Oak Ridge High School (El Dorado Hills) soccer field, the federal Agency for Toxic Substances and Disease Registry found that some student athletes, coaches and school workers had received substantial exposures. The inside of the school needed to be cleaned of dust.

Sister relationships 
  Warabi, Saitama Prefecture, Japan is a sister municipality to El Dorado County, California on 26 March 1975.

Communities

Cities
 Placerville (county seat)
 South Lake Tahoe

Census-designated places

 Auburn Lake Trails
 Cameron Park
 Camino
 Cold Springs
 Coloma
 Diamond Springs
 El Dorado Hills
 Georgetown
 Grizzly Flats
 Meyers
 Pollock Pines
 Shingle Springs
 Tahoma

Other unincorporated communities

 Camp Richardson
 Camp Sacramento
 Cool
 Echo Lake
 El Dorado
 Fair Play
 Garden Valley
 Greenwood
 Happy Valley
 Kyburz
 Omo Ranch
 Outingdale
 Phillips
 Pilot Hill
 Rescue
 Somerset
 Strawberry
 Twin Bridges

Population ranking

The population ranking of the following table is based on the 2010 census of El Dorado County.

† county seat

See also 
 Community Observatory
 National Register of Historic Places listings in El Dorado County, California
 Hiking trails in El Dorado County
 Placerville Mountain Democrat

Notes

References

External links

 
 El Dorado County Deeds, 1873-1930.
 official El Dorado County Historical Museum website
 El Dorado Environmental air quality management - naturally occurring asbestos information
 El Dorado County Weather
 El Dorado County Visitors Authority
 Sierra Community Access Television
 El Dorado Western Railway Foundation blog - The railway is restoring the Diamond & Caldor No. 4 Shay locomotive at the El Dorado County Historical Museum.

 
California counties
Counties in the Sacramento metropolitan area
Sierra Nevada (United States)
1850 establishments in California
Populated places established in 1850